The 1959 Harelbeke–Antwerp–Harelbeke was the second edition of the E3 Harelbeke cycle race and was held on 17 May 1959. The race started and finished in Harelbeke. The race was won by Norbert Kerckhove.

General classification

Notes

References

1959 in Belgian sport
1959